Lance Harris (born November 14, 1984) is a former American professional basketball player currently working as an assistant coach for the Long Island Nets of the NBA G League.

References

1984 births
Living people
American expatriate basketball people in Bosnia and Herzegovina
American expatriate basketball people in France
American expatriate basketball people in Greece
American expatriate basketball people in Italy
American expatriate basketball people in Montenegro
American expatriate basketball people in Russia
American expatriate basketball people in Slovenia
American expatriate basketball people in Turkey
American expatriate basketball people in Ukraine
American men's basketball players
Basketball players from Missouri
BC Politekhnika-Halychyna players
BC Ural Yekaterinburg players
Élan Béarnais players
Élan Chalon players
Ikaros B.C. players
Kansas State Wildcats men's basketball players
KK Igokea players
KK Mornar Bar players
KK Zlatorog Laško players
Kolossos Rodou B.C. players
Reyer Venezia players
Shooting guards
Sportspeople from Columbia, Missouri
Tofaş S.K. players
Vanoli Cremona players